Vavassori is a surname. Notable people with the surname include:

Andrea Vavassori (born 1995), Italian tennis player
Giovanni Vavassori (born 1952), Italian footballer and manager
Giuseppe Vavassori (1934–1983), Italian footballer

Italian-language surnames